Clubul Sportiv Municipal Mihai Viteazu Vulcan, commonly known as CSM Vulcan, or unofficially as Minerul Vulcan, is a Romanian football club based in Vulcan, Hunedoara County. Founded in 1921 as CS Vulcan and re-founded in 2016 as CSM Mihai Viteazu Vulcan, the club currently playing in the Liga IV – Hunedoara County.

History
The club was established in 1921 and played for the first time in the 1922–23 season of the Arad Regional Championship, when it managed to occupied the 5th place.

In 1924, CS Vulcan merged with CAMP to form UCASP (Uniunea Cluburilor Sportive ale Societății Petroșani – Sports Club Association of Petroșani Society). From February 1926 the merger ceases, the team from Vulcan being renamed as Minerul. In 1927 a new merger takes place, this time the three teams from Jiu Valley (CAMP, Jiul Lupeni and Minerul Vulcan) will played under the name of Jiul Lupeni.

The merger is abandoned In 1929, and the team from Vulcan will continue under the name of Minerul, but only for a short period because the mines in the locality are closing, and thus football is also abandoned. In 1939, the Vulcan team resumed its activity under the name of Antigaz, but only until 1944, when the Antigaz factory was closed. In 1955, with the reopening of the mine in the locality, the football team reappears, for which a stadium is also built in the Coroești area.

In the 1957–58 season, Minerul Vulcan ocuppied 12th place in the Hunedoara Regional Championship. 

Follow ten consecutive seasons in the regional championship in which was ranked as follows: 7th (1958–59), 7th (1959–60) in the Valea Jiului Series, 1st (1960–61) in the Valea Jiului Series, losing the promotion play-off with Minerul Deva (1–1 and 0–3 on the green table after the team from Vulcan left the field dissatisfied with the refereeing),  4th (1961–62), 4th  (1962–63), 7th (1963–64), 8th (1964–65), 9th (1965–66), 13th (1966–67), 10th (1967–68) in the Valea Jiului Series.

After many years in the regional or county championships, Minerul Vulcan promoted in Divizia C at the end of the 1976–77 season. With coach Gheorghe Kotormany on the bench and with players like Șarpe, Constantin, Viluț Oltean (goalkeepers), Polgar, Constantin Cătuți, Haiduc, Văduva, Achim, Croitoru, M. Pecsar, Dan Voicu, Justin Stoenescu, Ludovic Ferenczi, Octavian Popescu, Nemeș, Iacov, Zaharia Aruncuțeanu, Traian Moldovan among others, Minerul won  Hunedoara County Championship and the promotion play-off against the winner of Arad County Championship, Libertatea Arad (1–2 away and 3–0 at home).

Minerul was struggled to survive to third division, finishing the next three seasons in fourteenth place (1977–78) one point ahead of second-bottom, eleventh (1978–79) avoiding relegation by two points and eighth (1979–80) at just one point above the relegation zone.

In the summer of 1980, Minerul Vulcan merged with Știinta Petroșani to form Minerul Știinta Vulcan.

Honours
Liga IV – Hunedoara County
Winners (4): 1976–77, 2000–01, 2001–02, 2011–12
Runners-up (5): 1972–73, 1992–93, 1995–96, 1997–98, 2021–22

References

Hunedoara County
Association football clubs established in 1921
Football clubs in Hunedoara County
Liga III clubs
Liga IV clubs
1921 establishments in Romania
Mining association football teams in Romania